This is a list of authors who have written works of prose and poetry in the Ukrainian language.

A
Nikolai Amosov (1913–2002), novelist, essayist, and medical writer
Emma Andijewska (born 1931), novelist, poet, and short story writer
Nadija Hordijenko Andrianova (1921–1998), journalist, translator, and biographer
Sofia Andrukhovych (born 1982), novelist, translator, and editor
Yuri Andrukhovych (born 1960), novelist, poet, short story writer, essayist, and translator
Bohdan Ihor Antonych (1909–1937), poet, translator, and editor

B
Ivan Bahrianyi (1906–1963), poet, novelist, and essayist
Mykola Bakay (1931–1998), poet, and songwriter
Vasyl Barka (1908–2003), poet, writer, literary critic, and translator
Volodymyr Ivanovych Barvinok (1879–1943), historian, theologian, and bibliographer
Mykola Bazhan (1904–1983), poet, editor, and translator
Natalia Belchenko (born 1973), poet and translator
Nina Bichuya (born 1937), novelist, and children's writer
Natalka Bilotserkivets (born 1954), poet, and translator
Dmytro Blazheyovskyi (1910–2011), historian, and theologian
Osip Bodyansky (1808–1878), poet, memoirist, historian, and ethnographer

C
Dniprova Chayka (1861–1927), poet, short story writer, and children's writer
Olena Chekan (1946–2013), actress, voice artist, screenwriter, journalist and social activist
Marko Cheremshyna (1874–1927), short story writer, and translator
Boris Chichibabin (1923–1994), poet
Daria Chubata (born 1940), physician, writer, and poet
Taras Chubay (born 1970), poet, and songwriter
Pavlo Chubynsky (1839–1884), poet and ethnographer
Eugenia Chuprina (born 1971), poet, writer, playwright

D
Myroslav Dochynets (born 1959), novelist, short story writer, and journalist
Dmytro Dontsov (1883–1973), editor, publisher, journalist, and literary critic
Ivan Drach (born 1936), poet, screenwriter, and literary critic
Yuriy Drohobych (1450–1494), philosopher, science writer, theologian, and ethnographer
Alexander Dukhnovich (1803–1865), poet, historian, and ethnographer

E
Vasyl Ellan-Blakytny (1894–1925), poet, and journalist
Hryhorii Epik (1901–1937), novelist, short story writer, journalist, screenwriter, and publisher

F
Yuriy Fedkovych (1834–1888), short story writer, poet, folklorist, editor, and translator
Moysey Fishbein (born 1946), poet, editor, and translator 
Ivan Franko (1856–1916), novelist, poet, literary critic, journalist, and translator
Petro Franko (1890–1941), novelist, memoirist, and screenwriter

G
Vasyl Gogol-Yanovsky (1777–1825), poet, and playwright
Viktor Grabovskyj (born 1942), poet, translator, literary critic, and journalist
Lydia Grigorieva (born 1945), poet
Nataliya Gumenyuk (born 1983), journalist and writer

H
Pavlo Hai-Nyzhnyk (born 1971), poet, historian, science writer, and ethnographer
Yaroslav Halan (1902–1949), playwright, publicist, journalist, translator and radio host
Leonid Hlibov (1827–1893), poet, fabulist, children's writer, and editor 
Volodymyr Hnatiuk (1871–1926), folklorist, translator, ethnographer, and journalist
Yakub Holovatsky (1814–1888), historian, ethnographer, bibliographer, and poet
Oles Honchar (1918–1995), novelist, poet, short story writer, and journalist
Yevhen Hrebinka (1812–1848), poet, fabulist, novelist, short story writer, and translator
Borys Hrinchenko (1863–1910), historian, poet, and ethnographer
Hrytsko Hryhorenko (1867–1924), poet, short story writer, translator, and journalist
Volodymyr Huba (born 1938), poet
Yevhen Hutsalo (1937–1995), poet, novelist, journalist, and children's writer

I
Oksana Ivanenko (1906-1997), children's writer and translator
Volodymyr Ivasyuk (1949–1979), poet, and songwriter

K
Igor Kaczurowskyj (1918–2013), poet, translator, novelist, short story writer, literary scholar, and journalist
Ihor Kalynets (born 1939), poet
Irena Karpa (1980), songwriter, and journalist
Adrian Kashchenko (1858–1921), short story writer, historian, and publisher
Hnat Khotkevych (1877–1938), novelist, short story writer, ethnographer, and playwright
Mykola Khvylovy (1893–1933), poet, short story writer, and novelist
Max Kidruk (born 1984), novelist, short story writer, and travel writer
Iya Kiva (born 1984), poet, translator, journalist, and critic
Marianna Kiyanovska (born 1973), poet and translator
Olha Kobylianska (1863–1942), novelist, short story writer, and playwright
Oleksandr Konysky (1836–1900), novelist, poet, educator, and publisher
Oleksandr Korniychuk (1905–1972), playwright, and literary critic.
Ivan Feodosiyovych Korsak (born 1946), poet, novelist, short story writer, journalist, and editor
Nataliya Kobrynska (1851–1920), novelist, short story writer, editor, and publisher
Natalena Koroleva (1888–1966), novelist, short story writer
Sonya Koshkina (born 1985), journalist, author
Lina Kostenko (born 1930), poet, novelist, and children's writer
Ivan Kotliarevsky (1769–1838), poet and playwright
Mykhailo Kotsiubynsky (1864–1913), novelist and short story writer
Svitlana Kryvoruchko (born 1975), journalist, and editor
Roman Kudlyk (born 1941), poet, editor, and literary critic
Ivan Kulyk (1897–1937), poet, and translator
Mykola Kulish (1892–1927), playwright, and poet
Panteleimon Kulish (1819–1897), novelist, literary critic, poet, folklorist, historian, and translator
Zenon Kuzela (1882–1952), journalist, historian, and editor
Hryhory Kvitka (1778–1843), playwright, novelist, short story writer, and journalist

L
Bohdan Lepky (1872–1941), poet, and translator
Serhiy Leshchenko (born 1980), journalist, and editor
Oleh Lysheha (1949–2014), poet, playwright, and translator
Myroslav Laiuk (born 1990), novelist, poet, scriptwriter

M
Mykhaylo Maksymovych (1804–1873), historian, educator, and folklorist
Ivan Malkovych (born 1961), poet, and publisher
Volodymyr Malyk (1921–1998), novelist
Mykola Markevych (1804–1860), historian, ethnographer, and poet
Yaroslav Melnyk (born 1959), novelist, short story writer, and literary critic
Amvrosii Metlynsky (1814–1870), poet, ethnographer, and publisher.
Eugene Miroshnichenko (born 1939), critic, historian and journalist 
Pavlo Movchan (born 1939), poet
Panas Myrny (1849–1920), novelist, and playwright

N
Ivan Nechuy-Levytsky (1838–1918), novelist, short story writer, and playwright
Vsevolod Nestayko (1930–2014), children's writer

O
Theodore Odrach (1912–1964), novelist, short story writer, and memoirist
Oleksandr Oles (1878–1944), poet, and playwright
Yaroslav Oros (born 1959), novelist and journalist

P
Tomasz Padura (1801–1871), poet, and songwriter
Atena Pashko (1931-2012), chemical engineer, poet, social activist 
Dmytro Pavlychko (1929–2023), poet, translator, and screenwriter
Ihor Pavlyuk (born 1967), poet, novelist, and essayist
Olena Pchilka (1849–1930), poet, ethnographer, and translator
Halyna Petrosanyak (born 1969), poet, writer and translator
Viktor Petrov (1894–1969), novelist, and science writer
Mariyka Pidhiryanka (1881–1963), poet, and children's writer
Valerian Pidmohylny (1901–1937), novelist, short story writer, translator, and literary critic
Les Podervianskyi (born 1952), playwright, and poet
Yuri Pokalchuk (1941–2008), poet, novelist, short story writer, translator, and literary critic
Valentyn Prodaievych (born 1960), journalist and writer
Svitlana Pyrkalo (born 1976), novelist, essayist, editor, and journalist

R
Valentyn Rechmedin (1916–1986), novelist, journalist, editor, and literary critic 
Maksym Rylsky (1895–1964), poet

S
Ulas Samchuk (1905–1987), journalist, and publicist
Mariana Savka (born 1973),  poet, children's writer, translator and a publisher
Mykhaylo Semenko (1892–1937), poet, and editor
Iryna Senyk (1926-2009), poet
Markiyan Shashkevych (1811–1843), poet, and translator
Taras Shevchenko (1814–1861), poet, playwright, folklorist, and ethnographer
Vasyl Shkliar (born 1951), writer and political activist
Iryna Shuvalova (born 1986), poet, translator and scholar
Lyubov Sirota (born 1956), poet, essayist, playwright, journalist, and translator
Liudmyla Skyrda (born 1945), poet, translator, and literary critic
Maryna Sokolyan (born 1979), novelist, short story writer, and playwright
Volodymyr Sosiura (1898–1965), poet
Mykhailo Starytsky (1840–1904), poet, novelist, and playwright
Vasyl Stefanyk (1871–1936), short story writer
Ivan Steshenko (1873–1918), poet, journalist, editor, and translator
Vasyl Stus (1938–1985), poet, and publicist
Vasyl Symonenko (1935–1963), poet, and journalist

T
Yuriy Tarnawsky (born 1934) fiction, poetry, plays, translations, and literary criticism
Olena Teliha (1906–1942), novelist, short story writer, poet, playwright, translator, and literary critic
Hryhoriy Tiutiunnyk (1920–1961), poet
Tryzuby Stas (1948–2007), poet and songwriter
Volodymyr Tsybulko (born 1964), poet
Pavlo Tychyna (1891–1967), poet and translator

U
Lesya Ukrainka (1871–1913), poet, playwright, literary critic, and essayist

V
Ivan Vahylevych (1811–1866), poet, and ethnographer
Marko Vovchok (1833–1907), novelist, short story writer, and translator
Vira Vovk (born 1926), poet, novelist, playwright, and translator
Volodymyr Vynnychenko (1880–1951), novelist, short story writer, and playwright
Leonid Vysheslavsky (1914–2002), poet, literary critic, and translator
Ostap Vyshnya (1889–1956), short story writer, and journalist

Y
Tetiana Yakovenko (born 1954), poet, literary critic, teacher
Mykhailo Yalovy (1895–1937), novelist, poet, playwright, and editor
Volodymyr Yaniv (1908–1981), poet
Lyubov Yanovska (1861–1933), novelist, short story writer, and playwright
Yevheniya Yaroshynska (1868–1904), journalist, short story writer, editor, and translator
Volodymyr Yavorivsky (1942–2021), novelist, short story writer, poet, and journalist
Serhiy Yefremov (1876–1939), journalist, and literary critic
Olexiy Yurin (born 1982), poet

Z
Oksana Zabuzhko (born 1960), novelist, poet, essayist
Pavlo Zahrebelnyi (1924–2009), novelist, and short story writer
Mykola Zerov (1890–1937), poet, translator, and literary critic
Serhiy Zhadan (born 1974), poet, novelist, essayist, and translator
Iryna Zhylenko (born 1941–2013), poet, short story writer, and children's writer

 
 
Ukrainian language
Writers
Ukrainian

See also
Ukrainian literature
Contemporary Ukrainian literature
List of Ukrainian-language poets
List of Ukrainian women writers

References